
Year 371 BC was a year of the pre-Julian Roman calendar. At the time, it was known as the Fifth year without Tribunate or Consulship (or, less frequently, year 383 Ab urbe condita). The denomination 371 BC for this year has been used since the early medieval period, when the Anno Domini calendar era became the prevalent method in Europe for naming years.

Events 
 By place 

 Greece 
 A fresh peace congress is summoned at Sparta. At the peace conference, the Spartan King Agesilaus II (with the support of Athens) refuses to allow the Thebans to sign the treaty on behalf of all Boeotia. The Theban statesman Epaminondas, who is boeotarch (one of the five magistrates of the Boeotian federation), maintains Thebes' position, even when it leads to the exclusion of Thebes from the peace treaty.
 Thebes' actions at the peace congress lead to a war between Sparta and Thebes. The Spartans have an army stationed on Thebes' western frontier, waiting to follow up their diplomatic success by a crushing military attack. However, at the Battle of Leuctra, the Theban generals, Epaminondas and Pelopidas, win a decisive victory over the Spartans under the other Spartan king, Cleombrotus I (who is killed in the battle). Epaminondas wins the battle with a tactical innovation which involves striking the enemy first at their strongest, instead of their weakest, point, with such crushing force that the attack is irresistible. As a result of this battle, the Boeotian federation is saved.
 Athens does not welcome the Theban victory, fearing the rising aggressiveness of Thebes. After the Theban victory, the old alliance between the Persians and the Thebans is restored.
 With the unexpected defeat of Sparta by the Thebans, the Arcadians decide to re-assert their independence. They rebuild Mantinea, form an Arcadian League and build a new federal city, Megalopolis.
 Agesipolis II succeeds his father Cleombrotus I as king of Sparta.

 By topic 

 Astronomy 
 It is suggested that the original comet associated with the Kreutz Sungrazers family of comets passes perihelion at this time. It is thought to have been observed by Aristotle and Ephorus during this year.

Births 
 Chanakya, Indian philosopher and advisor (approximate date)
 Theophrastus, Greek philosopher

Deaths 
 Cleombrotus I, king of Sparta (killed in the Battle of Leuctra)

References